Louis Purcell (born 24 October 1974) is a wrestler from American Samoa.

Purcell competed at the 1996 Summer Olympics in the wrestling 90 kg.

References

External links
 

1974 births
Living people
American Samoan male sport wrestlers
Olympic wrestlers of American Samoa
Wrestlers at the 1996 Summer Olympics